This article lists those who were potential candidates for the Republican nomination for Vice President of the United States in the 1976 election. At the 1976 Republican National Convention, incumbent President Gerald Ford narrowly won the presidential nomination over former California Governor Ronald Reagan. Ford had decided not to choose Vice President Nelson Rockefeller as his running mate, due to Rockefeller's unpopularity with the right wing of the Republican Party. He instead chose Senator Bob Dole of Kansas. Dole was acceptable to the conservative wing of the party, and Ford hoped that Dole would help the ticket win the western states and the agricultural vote. The Ford–Dole ticket lost the general election to the Carter–Mondale ticket. Though he would not win the presidential nomination, Reagan announced before the convention that he would pick Senator Richard Schweiker of Pennsylvania as his running mate. Dole went on to become Senate Republican leader, and the Republican presidential nominee in 1996, losing the general election to incumbent President Bill Clinton.

Potential candidates

Nominee

Other Potential Candidates

See also

1976 Republican Party presidential primaries
1976 Republican National Convention
1976 United States presidential election
List of United States major party presidential tickets

References

Vice presidency of the United States
1976 United States presidential election
Gerald Ford
Bob Dole
Ronald Reagan